Wende (also Althea, Blackmons Crossing) is an unincorporated community in Russell County, Alabama, United States.

Notes

Unincorporated communities in Russell County, Alabama
Unincorporated communities in Alabama